The 2004–05 United Hockey League season was the 14th season of the United Hockey League (Colonial Hockey League before 1997), a North American minor professional league. 14 teams participated in the regular season and the Muskegon Fury won the league title.

Regular season

Colonial Cup-Playoffs

External links
 Season 2004/05 on hockeydb.com

United Hockey League seasons
UHL
UHL